The 2023 League1 British Columbia season will be the second season of play for League1 British Columbia, a pro-am league in the Canadian soccer league system. Eight clubs will participate in the 2023 season in both the men's and women's divisions.

Format 
The regular season will be contested by eight clubs and will run from April 29 to July 23, 2023. Each team will play 14 games in a double round-robin format with seven games at home and seven on the road. The top-four teams will advance to the playoffs with the Championship Final scheduled for the BC Day long weekend. The men's and women's divisions will use identical schedules with the two matches being played as double-headers on the same day.

Men's division 
The teams will play each other team twice (home and away) for a 14 game season, with the top four teams advancing to the playoffs. The winner of the regular season will qualify for the 2024 Canadian Championship.

League table

Playoffs

Women's division 
The winner of the women's regular season will qualify for the Women's Interprovincial Championship.

League table

Playoffs

Juan de Fuca Plate
The Juan de Fuca Plate is awarded to the League1 British Columbia club with the highest combined point total between the men's and women's divisions in regular season matches.

References

External links 

League1 BC
League1 British Columbia
BC